The Nanle–Linzhou Expressway, abbreviated as Nanlin Expressway and designated as S22 in Henan's expressway system, is  long regional expressway in the northern part of Henan, China.

Detailed itinerary

References

Expressways in Henan
Transport in Henan